San Demetrio London is a 1943 British World War II docudrama based on the true story of the 1940 salvage of the tanker MV San Demetrio by some of her own crew, who reboarded her after she had been set on fire by the German heavy cruiser Admiral Scheer and then abandoned, during the Battle of the Atlantic. The film was produced by Michael Balcon for Ealing Studios and directed by Charles Frend.

Plot
The film is a reconstruction of the story of the salvage of the British tanker, MV San Demetrio. Carrying a cargo of oil home from Galveston, Texas, she was abandoned by her crew having been set on fire by shells from the German cruiser Admiral Scheer. Of the three lifeboats which escaped the damaged tanker, two were picked up by other ships. After drifting for three days, the occupants of the third, who included the chief engineer and the second officer, reboarded the burning San Demetrio, extinguished the fires, and, having managed to restart the engines, returned to Britain, sailing into the Clyde ten days later.

Cast

 Arthur Young as Captain George Waite
 Walter Fitzgerald as Chief Engineer Charles Pollard
 Ralph Michael as 2nd Officer Hawkins
 Neville Mapp as 3rd Engineer Willey
 Barry Letts as Apprentice John Jones
 Michael Allen as Cadet Roy Housden
 Frederick Piper as Boatswain W.E. Fletcher
 Herbert Cameron as Pumpman Davies
 John Owers as Steward
 Gordon Jackson as Messboy John Jamieson
 Robert Beatty as "Yank" Preston
 Charles Victor as Deckhand
 James McKechnie as Deckhand
 John Coyle as Deckhand
 Duncan McIntyre as Deckhand (as Duncan MacIntyre)
 Rex Holt as Deckhand
 Mervyn Johns as Greaser John Boyle
 Lawrence O'Madden as Captain E.S.F. Fegen V.C. – HMS Jervis Bay
 James Donald as Gunnery Control Officer – HMS Jervis Bay
 James Sadler as Officer of the Watch – HMS Jervis Bay
 Peter Miller Street as Midshipman – HMS Jervis Bay
 David Horne as Mr. Justice Langton
 Nigel Clarke as R.J.E. Dodds – Shipping Manager
 James Knight as Captain Smith – SS Gloucester City

Production
Although Charles Frend is given sole credit as director, the film was completed by Robert Hamer after Frend became ill. The San Demetrio'''s chief engineer, Charles Pollard, was employed as a special adviser. Early film star Bessie Love, her acting prospects having declined, worked on this movie doing continuity, first as an assistant and towards the end of production taking over when the original "continuity girl" left to deliver a baby.

Reception
According to trade papers, the film was a success at the British box office in 1944. The Monthly Film Bulletin'' said that "In places the music is a trifle too strident; some of the model shots are less successful than others, but on the whole justice has been done to a great theme.

The model used in the film is on display at the Imperial War Museum in London.

References

External links
 
 
 
 

1943 films
British black-and-white films
British war drama films
Films directed by Charles Frend
Films produced by Michael Balcon
British films based on actual events
World War II films made in wartime
World War II naval films
British documentary films
1943 documentary films
1940s war drama films
1943 drama films
1940s British films
1940s English-language films